James Allan Reid (May 8, 1897 – March 2, 1978) was a Canadian politician. He served in the Legislative Assembly of British Columbia from 1952 to 1960 from the electoral district of Salmon Arm, a member of the Social Credit Party.

References

1897 births
1978 deaths
British Columbia Social Credit Party MLAs